Eudiptera is a suborder of Diptera under an alternative subordinal classification based largely on fossil taxa; it has not gained wide acceptance among non-paleontological dipterists and is presented here for comparative purposes only.

All of the taxa included in Eudiptera are also members of the Nematocera, and the latter is the preferred grouping; both are paraphyletic.

Nematocera
Insect suborders

pt:Nematocera